Club Patín Alcorcón, is a Spanish rink hockey club based in Alcorcón, Madrid.

History
Founded in 1982, CP Alcorcón is best known for its women's team, which competes in the OK Liga. In 2009 it was the runner-up of the OK Liga and the Copa de la Reina, and in 2010 it reached the final of the CERH Women's European League, lost to Gijón HC.

In March 2014, Alcorcón won the CERH Women's European League for the first time.

Trophies
European League: '''1
2013–14

Season to season

References

External links
Official website

Sports clubs established in 1982
Spanish rink hockey clubs
Sports teams in Madrid
Sport in Alcorcón
1982 establishments in Spain